Antara Biswas (born 21 November 1982), better known by her stage name Monalisa, is an Indian actress. She has done mostly Bhojpuri language films, and has also appeared in Hindi, Bengali, Odia, Tamil, Kannada and Telugu language films. She was a contestant of Indian show Bigg Boss 10 in 2016 and is known for portraying Mohana Rathod in Nazar. In 2020 to 2021, she had played the main antagonist, Iravati Verma in Namak Issk Ka on Colors TV.

Biography and early life
Antara Biswas was born to a Bengali Hindu family on 21 November 1982. She adopted the stage name of Monalisa at the behest of her uncle. She studied at Julien Day School in Elgin Road, South Kolkata, and graduated from Ashutosh College of the University of Calcutta, earning a BA degree in Sanskrit before starting out a few years ago as a small-time TV actress and model in Odia video albums.

Career 
She acted in several low-budget films before making her debut in Bollywood with Blackmail, starring Ajay Devgn and Suniel Shetty. She then acted in South Indian films before coming to notice through her role in Tauba Tauba opposite Amin Gazi. She acted in a Kannada film titled Jackpot.

In 2010, The Hindu reported that Monalisa (along with Rinku Ghosh) was the most sought after actress in the Bhojpuri film industry.

In February 2022, she participated in Star Plus' Smart Jodi with her husband, Vikrant Singh Rajpoot. In December 2022, she portraying Rama in Dangal TV's sitcom Favvara Chowk: Indore Ki Shaan.

Personal life
She married Bhojpuri actor Vikrant Singh Rajpoot in the Bigg Boss house on 17 January 2017.

Filmography

Bhojpuri films 

 Bhole Shankar (2008)
 Khatailal Mithailal (2008)
 Kaha Jaiba Raja Najariya Ladaike (2008)
 Tu Babua Hamaar (2008)
 Shrimaan Driver Babu (2007)
 Ho Gaini Deewana Tohra Pyar Me (2009)
 Kahan Jaiba Raja Nazariya Ladai Ke (2009)
 Hum Bahubali (2009)
 Dulha Albela (2009)
 Ranbhoomi (2009)
 Pratigya (2009) - Itemsong "Lehariya Luta Ae Raja"
 Hum Hai Khalnayak (2009)
 Sindur Daan (2009)
 Jade Mein Balma Pyara Lage (2009)
 Sahar Wali Jaan Mareli (2009)
 Ek Aur Kurukshetra (2010)
 Tu Jaan Hau Hamaar (2010)
 Dharmatma  (2010)
 Nathuniya Pe Goli Maare (2010)
 Bhojpuriya Don (2010)
 Rangbaz Daroga – Aanchal (2010)
 Nainihal (2010)
  Saat Saheliya (2010)
 Devra Bada Satawela (2010)
 Devra Bhail Deewana (2014)
 Mrityunjay (2010) (Special Appearance)
 Loafer (2010)
 Kanoon Hamra Mutthi Mein (2010)
 Daraar (2010)
 Mora Balma Chail Chabila (2011)
 Apne Begaane (2011)
 Aakhri Rasta (2011)
 Barood (2011)
 The Great Hero Hiralal (2011)
 Gundairaj (2011)
 Ladaai La Ankhiyan Ae Lounde Raja (2011)
 Kartavya (2011)
 Hamaar Devdas (2011)
 Bhaiya Hamar Dayavan (2012)
 Mehraru Bina Ratiya Kaise Kati (2012)
 "Raja Babu" (2012)
 Dakait (2012)
 Khuddar (2012) – Sunita
 Naagin (2012)
 Khoon Pasina (2012)
 Mehraru Bina Ratiya Kasie Kati (2012)
 Elan E Jung (2012)
 Dabangg Mora Balma (2013)
 Mafia (2013)
 Rang De Pyar Ke Rang Mein(2013)
 Jaan Lebu Ka Ho (2013)
 Banaraswali (2013)
 Pratibandh (2013)
 Desh Pardesh (2013)
 Kasam Wardi Ke (2013)
 Biwi No. 1 (2013)
 Lagal Sanheiya Ke Dor (2013)
 Saala Main To Sahib Ban Gaya (2013)
 Ziddi Aashiq (2013)
 Saawariyan Tose Laagi Kaisi Lagan (2013)
 Mati Preet Jagawale (2013)
 Zanzeer (2013)
 Ishq Ka Manjan Ghise Hai Piya (2013)
 Gumrah  (2013)
 Ijjat (2013)
 Chhamia Bhelwali (2013)
 Jeevan Yudhh (2013)
 Khoon Bhari Maang (2013)
 Saiyan Bhailan Pardesiyaa (2013)
 Jodi No. 1 (2013)
 Ghulam (2013)
 Mita Deb Raavanraaj (2013)
 Budhwa Tamtamwala (2013)
 Lagal Ba Pyar Ke Bukhar (2013)
 Tulsi Bin Suna Anganwa (2013)
 Ganga Putra (2013)
 Chedi Ganga Kinarewala (2013)
 Natawar Lal (2013)
 Ek Nihattha (2013)
 Pocket Gangsters (2015)
 Rakth Bhumi (2015)
 Prem Leela (2015)
 Saiyan Toofani (2015)
 Suhag (2015)
 Rakhtbhoomi (2015)
 Sarkar Raj (2017)
 Jai Shree Ram (2017)
 Dulhan Chahi Pakistan Se 2 (2018)

Web-series

Television

See also
 List of Bhojpuri cinema actresses

References

External links 

 

Living people
Actresses in Bengali cinema
Asutosh College alumni
University of Calcutta alumni
Bengali television actresses
Indian film actresses
Indian television actresses
Actresses in Bhojpuri cinema
1982 births
Bigg Boss (Hindi TV series) contestants